The name Forrest has been used for five tropical cyclones worldwide. 

Tropical Storm Forrest (1980) (T8005, 06W, Gloring)
Typhoon Forrest (1983) (T8310, 11W, Ising), a deadly and destructive Category 5 super typhoon that hit Japan
Typhoon Forrest (1986) (T8621, 22W)
Typhoon Forrest (1989) (T8930, 31W)
Cyclone Forrest (1992) (T9230, 31W), formed in the Western Pacific and crossed into the Indian Ocean

Pacific typhoon set index articles